Max Ritvo (December 19, 1990 – August 23, 2016) was an American poet. Milkweed Editions posthumously published a full-length collection of his poems, Four Reincarnations, to positive critical reviews. Milkweed published Letters from Max (co-written with Sarah Ruhl) and a second collection of Ritvo's poems, The Final Voicemails, in September 2018.

Biography 

Max Ritvo was born in Los Angeles, California, on December 19, 1990. He began writing poetry at the age of 4. A graduate of Harvard-Westlake School in Los Angeles, Ritvo earned his BA in English from Yale University, where he studied with the poet Louise Glück, and his MFA in Poetry from Columbia University.

In 2014, he was awarded a Poetry Society of America Chapbook Fellowship for his chapbook AEONS. He edited poetry at Parnassus: Poetry in Review and was a teaching fellow at Columbia.

On August 1, 2015, he married Victoria Jackson-Hanen, a Ph.D. candidate in psychology at Princeton University. Glück officiated the ceremony.

Ritvo was diagnosed with Ewing's sarcoma at age 16 and died from the disease at his home in Los Angeles on August 23, 2016. His survivors include his wife Victoria; his father Edward Ritvo, a psychiatrist and researcher; his mother Riva Ariella Ritvo-Slifka, an autism expert and assistant clinical professor at Yale Child Study Center; and his three siblings, Victoria Black, Skye Oryx, and David Slifka. The investor and philanthropist Alan B. Slifka, who died in 2011, was his stepfather.  

Ritvo's work has appeared in Poetry, The New Yorker, Boston Review, and as a Poem-a-day on Poets.org. He gave numerous written and radio interviews before his death.

Critical reception 
Four Reincarnations, a full-length collection of Ritvo's poems, was published by Milkweed Editions in September 2016.

Sarah Ruhl of The New Republic called Ritvo "a poet of uncommon grace, vision and originality" who "wrote with an incandescent mind, a fearless and playful heart, and a thrilling ear".

Literary critic Helen Vendler reviewed his work and likened him to Keats. She wrote:

David Orr, reviewing Four Reincarnations for the New York Times, wrote:

Orr also quoted, then commented on the end of Ritvo's poem, "The Hanging Gardens":

According to Lucie Brock-Broido of Boston Review, Ritvo is "a Realist, a gifted comic, an astronomer, a child genius, a Surrealist, a brainiac, and a purveyor of pure (and impure) joy. His work is composed, quite simply, of candor, of splendor, and of abandon." Louise Glück wrote of his first published collection that it was "one of the most original and ambitious first books in my experience... marked by intellectual bravado and verbal extravagance."

Stephanie Burt of the Los Angeles Review of Books wrote, "...the poems are equally conscious of impending death and of the next day’s life, having spent time in a pool of self-skepticism and then emerged shining, shockingly clean..." While noting that Ritvo "seems to have written most of this book with the clarity, the near equanimity, the distance from ordinary reversals and struggles, of much older poets who know that they are dying," Burt also writes, "But mortality is rarely his only subject: shyness, gratitude, and erotic attachment are as important as death itself."

Legacy 
In 2017, Milkweed Editions announced the Max Ritvo Poetry Prize, an annual US$10,000 award and publication contract, supported by Riva Ariella Ritvo-Slifka and the Alan B. Slifka Foundation.

In September 2017 Milkweed Editions announced a second collection of Ritvo's poems that were published in 2018, as well as a book he co-wrote with Sarah Ruhl, Letters from Max.

Ritvo's legacy at Columbia University's School of the Arts was celebrated on October 18, 2017, with the Inaugural Max Ritvo Poetry Series and scholarship, sponsored by a $US 500,000 grant from Riva Ariella Ritvo-Slifka and the Alan B. Slifka Foundation, Inc.

Selected works

Collections
 AEONS. (Chapbook). Poetry Society of America. 2014.
 Four Reincarnations. Milkweed Editions. 2016.
 The Final Voicemails: Poems, edited by Louise Glück. Milkweed Editions. 2018.
 Letters from Max, co-authored by Sarah Ruhl. Milkweed Editions. 2018.

Selected poems
 Ritvo, Max. "Poem to My Litter." The New Yorker 27 June 2016.
 Ritvo, Max. "Leisure-Loving Man Suffers Untimely Death." The Iowa Review Fall 2016. 
 Ritvo, Max. "Dawn of Man." Poetry Sept. 2016. 
 Ritvo, Max. "The Big Loser." Poetry Sept. 2016.

References

External links 
 Ritvo's official website
 Ritvo's author page on Milkweed Editions
 Poem to My Litter (animated video, 3:00 min.)
 Afternoon (animated video, 1:20 min.)

1990 births
2016 deaths
21st-century American poets
American male poets
Columbia University School of the Arts alumni
Deaths from cancer in California
Writers from Los Angeles
Yale University alumni
21st-century American male writers
Harvard-Westlake School alumni
Poets from California